María del Pilar Ortiz is a Colombian journalist.

She is most recognized as the former director and anchorwoman of Noticias Univision in Tampa, Florida; a position she maintained for eleven years. In addition to Univision, she has worked as a reporter for RCN TV, Caracol TV, and CBS TeleNoticias. She has interviewed multiple politicians and celebrities including Barack Obama, John McCain, Andrés Pastrana, Hugo Chávez, Shakira, Carlos Vives, Celia Cruz, Tito Nieves, Ricardo Arjona, and Ricky Martin. In 1997, while working at Caracol TV she received the Simon Bolivar National Journalism Award in the category of "Best Television Chronicle of the Year".

Today, Maria del Pilar Ortiz serves as a consultant for La Guia Magazine. She is also a columnist for the weekly newspaper 7 Dias along with Jorge Ramos.

October 4, 2014 was declared "Maria del Pilar Ortiz Hispanic Woman of the Year Day" by Mayor of Tampa Bob Buckhorn, when Tampa Hispanic Heritage, Inc. named her their Hispanic Woman of the Year.

References

External links
 
 

Year of birth missing (living people)
Living people
Colombian journalists
Colombian women journalists
Colombian emigrants to the United States
Colombian television presenters
Colombian women television presenters
Hispanic and Latino American people in television
American television news anchors
Pontifical Xavierian University alumni
Colombian columnists
Colombian women columnists